Nora Ladi Daduut (born May 10, 1953) is a Nigerian Professor and Politician. She is the Senator representing Plateau South Senatorial District at the 9th Nigerian National Assembly. She was elevated to the position of professor in 2018 by the University of Jos. She is the first female senator from Plateau State.

Career
Daduut is a professor of French and resigned as the head of the department of French at the University of Jos, Plateau State.

Political career
In the 2020 Plateau South Senatorial District bye election, she represented the All Progressives Congress at the election where she polled 83,151 votes, while her closest rival at the polls Hon. George Daika, representing the Peoples Democratic Party (PDP), polled 70,838 votes. She was sworn into the senate on December 15, 2020.

Notes

References

Members of the Senate (Nigeria)
People from Jos
1953 births
Living people
Academic staff of the University of Jos
All Progressives Congress politicians

8.